The Marawi Grand Mosque, also known as the Islamic Center is a mosque located in Pangarungan Village, Marawi, Lanao del Sur, Philippines.

History

Establishment
The first phase of the mosque's development was in the 1950s which was completed in 1970. The implementation was led by the site's landowner Datu Pangarungan Disalongan with funding coming from local-based private individuals and some foreign donors. Foreign ministers and diplomats from the Organisation of Islamic Cooperation often made stopovers in the mosque when making official visits to Marawi.

Battle of Marawi

During the siege of Marawi in May 2017, the mosque was among the structures captured by ISIL affiliated Maute group militants. Philippine government forces regained control of the city but several structures including the grand mosque was left heavily damaged after the battle.

Post-siege
On September 8, the first Salahtul Jumaah was held since the liberation of Marawi. Task Force Bangon Marawi, a government agency planning to reconstruct and repair about 31 mosques in Marawi damaged during the siege, plans to start repair works on the Grand Mosque in August 2020. It was completed by October 2021 and Inaugurated by President Rodrigo Roa Duterte in the presence of Secretary Saidamen B. Pangarungan of the National Commission on Muslim Filipinos, Lanao Del Sur Governor Mamintal Adiong Jr., Marawi City Mayor Majul Gandamra.

On December 2, 2021, the rebuilt  Grand Mosque was turned over by Secretary Eduardo Del Rosario, Task Force Bangon Marawi, to Hadji Abdul Amai Manabilang Pangarungan and NCMF Secretary Saidamen B. Pangarungan, President and chairman, respectively of the Marawi Grand Mosque.

Facilities
The Marawi Grand Mosque has three floors and a basement and has a total floor area of  square meters. It has the capacity to accommodate 20,000 worshippers at any given time, and is considered to be the biggest Islamic place of worship in the Philippines. Ran by the Jameo Mindanao Al–Islamie, Islamic Center of Marawi, the structure also hosts a madrasa and a library.

References

Mosques in Mindanao
Marawi
Buildings and structures in Lanao del Sur